Loren Robert White (born August 22, 1938) is a former American football player. He played for Ohio State in the late 1950s. White played fullback and line on defense. In 1957, he and the Buckeyes won the Big Ten Conference outright and won the 1958 Rose Bowl, 10–7, over Oregon.  In 1958, he led in scoring and rushing for the Buckeyes.

In 1958, White was named First-team All-American.  He was also named Academic All-American Player of the Year in 1958.  In 1957, 1958, and 1959 he was named an Ohio State Academic All-Big Ten Honoree.  In 1958 White placed 4th as the Buckeyes Heisman Trophy finalist.

In his only NFL season, White played just six games.

References

1938 births
Living people
People from Portsmouth, Ohio
Sportspeople from Covington, Kentucky
Players of American football from Kentucky
American football fullbacks
Ohio State Buckeyes football players
All-American college football players
Houston Oilers players
American Football League players